Mein Freund Winnetou is a 1980 German television miniseries, starring Pierre Brice in the titular role and directed by Marcel Camus. A Western, it is part of an extended series of films and television series in which Brice played the fictional Apache chief Winnetou, first introduced in novels by Karl May. It also featured performances from actors such as Ralf Wolter and Siegfried Rauch. In some countries it was released in fourteen episodes, while in others it was released in seven longer episodes.

Cast
 Pierre Brice as Winnetou
 Siegfried Rauch as Old Shatterhand
 Ralf Wolter as Sam Hawkens
 Arthur Brauss as Lt. Robert Merril
 Elpidia Carrillo as Wetatoni
 Rosenda Monteros as Hehaka Win
 Jacques François as Stevens
 Jean-Claude Deret as Charbonneau
 Eric Ho ]] as Tashunko
 Miguel Ángel Fuentes ]] as Yaqui

See also
List of German television series

External links
 

1980s Western (genre) television series
1980 German television series debuts
1980 German television series endings
Live action television shows based on films
Television shows based on German novels
German-language television shows
Das Erste original programming
Television shows based on works by Karl May